Batangafo is a town located in the Central African Republic prefecture of Ouham-Fafa at the confluence of Ouham River and its affluent Fafa.

There is an airport in Bafangafo.

History 
In August 2014 heavy clashes erupted in Batangafo between Séléka and Sangaris forces resulting in more than 50 deaths. On 31 October 2018 heavy clashes broke out between Anti-balaka and ex-Séléka fighters in Batangafo resulting in at least 15 deaths The town was recaptured by government forces on 12 April 2021.

On December 2020, Batangafo became the capital of Ouham-Fafa Prefecture.

See also 
 Lake Chad replenishment project
 Waterway

References 

Sub-prefectures of the Central African Republic
Populated places in Ouham-Fafa